Calgary Shepard is a federal electoral district in Alberta, Canada, that has been represented in the House of Commons of Canada since 2015.

Calgary Shepard was created by the 2012 federal electoral boundaries redistribution and was legally defined in the 2013 representation order. It came into effect upon the call of the 42nd Canadian federal election, scheduled for October 2015. It was created out of parts of the electoral districts of Calgary East and Calgary Southeast. The riding's name refers to Shepard, Alberta.

Demographics
According to the Canada 2016 Census

 Languages: (2016) 77.7% English, 3.6% Tagalog, 2.3% Spanish, 1.6% French, 1.4% Vietnamese, 1.1% Mandarin, 0.9% Cantonese, 0.8% Panjabi, 0.8% Russian, 0.8% Arabic, 0.8% Polish, 0.6% German, 0.6% Urdu, 0.5% Romanian

Members of Parliament

This riding has elected the following members of the House of Commons of Canada:

Election results

References

Alberta federal electoral districts
Politics of Calgary